Group actions are central to Riemannian geometry and defining orbits (control theory). 
The orbits of computational anatomy consist of anatomical shapes and medical images; the anatomical  shapes are submanifolds of differential geometry consisting of points, curves, surfaces and subvolumes,.
This generalized the ideas of the more familiar orbits of linear algebra which are linear vector spaces.   Medical images are scalar and tensor images from medical imaging. The group actions are used to define models of human shape which accommodate variation. These orbits are deformable templates as originally formulated more abstractly in pattern theory.

The orbit model of computational anatomy
The central model of human anatomy in computational anatomy is  a Groups and group action, a classic formulation from differential geometry.  The orbit is called the space of shapes and forms. The space of shapes are denoted , with the group   with law of composition ; the action of the group on shapes is denoted , where the action of the group  is defined to satisfy 

The orbit  of the template becomes the space of all shapes, .

Several group actions in computational anatomy

Submanifolds: organs, subcortical structures, charts, and immersions
For sub-manifolds , parametrized by a chart or immersion , the diffeomorphic action the flow of the position

.

Scalar images such as MRI, CT, PET
Most popular are scalar images, with action on the right via the inverse.
.

Oriented tangents on curves, eigenvectors  of tensor matrices
Many different imaging modalities are being used with various actions. For images such that  is a three-dimensional vector then

Tensor matrices
Cao et al.
 
examined actions for mapping MRI images measured via diffusion tensor imaging and represented via there principle eigenvector. 
For tensor fields a positively oriented orthonormal basis 

The Frénet frame of three orthonormal vectors,  deforms as a tangent,  deforms like
H is uniquely constrained by the
basis being positive and orthonormal.

For  non-negative symmetric matrices, an action would become .

For mapping MRI DTI images (tensors), then eigenvalues are preserved with the diffeomorphism rotating eigenvectors and preserves the eigenvalues. 
Given eigenelements
, then the action becomes

Orientation Distribution Function and High Angular Resolution HARDI

Orientation distribution function (ODF) characterizes the angular profile of the diffusion probability density function of water molecules and can be reconstructed from High Angular Resolution Diffusion Imaging (HARDI). The ODF is a probability density function defined on a unit sphere, . In the field of information geometry, the space of ODF forms a Riemannian manifold with the Fisher-Rao metric. For the purpose of LDDMM ODF mapping, the square-root representation is chosen because it is one of the most efficient representations found to date as the various Riemannian operations, such as geodesics, exponential maps, and logarithm maps, are available in closed form.

Based on the derivation in, this group action is defined as

References

Computational anatomy
Computational anatomy
Geometry
Fluid mechanics
Theory of probability distributions
Neural engineering
Biomedical engineering